Hasanparthy is a mandal in Hanumakonda district in the state of Telangana in India. It is governed by Greater Warangal Municipal Corporation.

Transport

Roadway
Hasanparthy is very well connected with road. NH 563 passes through the area, that connects the city of Warangal.

Railway
Hasanparthy has a railway station – Hasanparthy Road, that is preceding the Kazipet Junction on Nagpur–Hyderabad line.

References 

Villages in Hanamkonda district
Mandals in Hanamkonda district